Tru, or TRU, may refer to:

 Tactics and Rescue Unit, Ontario Provincial Police
 Tasmanian Rugby Union
 Thompson Rivers University, in British Columbia, Canada
 Transuranic waste
 Tru, an album by Cro
 TRU (band) (The Real Untouchables), U.S. rap group
 Tru by Hilton, a hotel brand from Hilton Worldwide
 Tru fm, a South African commercial radio station
 Tru Kids, US owner of Toys "R" Us chain
 Tru (Lloyd album), 2018
 Tru (mobile network)
 Tru (Ovlov album)
 Tru (play), about Truman Capote
 Tru (restaurant) (1999–2017), French restaurant located in Chicago, Illinois, U.S.
 "Tru" (song), a 2016 song by American singer Lloyd from the EP Tru
 TRU, the IATA code for Capitán FAP Carlos Martínez de Pinillos International Airport, Trujillo, Peru
 tru, the ISO 639-3 code for the Turoyo language 
 TRU, the National Rail code for Truro railway station, Cornwall, UK
 truTV, an American multichannel television network

See also
TRÜ, University of Tartu
 Tru Love (disambiguation)
 True (disambiguation)
 
 
 Trus (disambiguation)